Military Colleges may refer to:
IDF Military Colleges, Israel
Canadian Military Colleges
King George Royal Indian Military Colleges